Ngwe Hee Sem ( or Ah Sem, born ) is a Malaysian politician from the Malaysian Chinese Association (MCA), a component party of the ruling Barisan Nasional (BN) coalition who has served as Member of the Malacca State Executive Council (EXCO) in the BN state administration under Chief Minister Sulaiman Md Ali since November 2021 and Member of the Malacca State Legislative Assembly (MLA) for Machap Jaya since November 2021. He is also the sole Malacca EXCO member of Chinese descent and one of the only two MLAs from MCA along with Lim Ban Hong. In MCA, he is member of the Central Committee, Organising Secretary of MCA of Malacca and Vice Chairman of MCA of Alor Gajah Division.

Political career
Ngwe was elected to the Malacca State Legislative Assembly in the 2021 state election, winning the seat of Machap Jaya from incumbent Ginie Lim Siew Lin of the Pakatan Harapan (PH) opposition coalition who did not recontest. In addition, he was also appointed as Member of the Malacca state EXCO in charge of Unity, Human Resources, Community Relations and Consumer Affairs by Chief Minister Sulaiman in November 2021.

Election results

See also
 Machap Jaya (state constituency)

References

1968 births
Living people
People from Malacca
Malaysian people of Chinese descent
Malaysian Buddhists
Malaysian Chinese Association politicians
Members of the Malacca State Legislative Assembly
University of Tennessee alumni
21st-century Malaysian politicians